FC Shakhter-Bulat is a Kazakhstani football club based in Temirtau. It was previously known as FC Bolat CSKA (2004) and FC Bolat MSK(2005). It currently plays as the farm club of Shakhter Karagandy.

History
Formed as Metallurg, the club was known as Stroitel between 1969 and 1977 before adopting their current name. They were a leading side in the Soviet-era game, winning the Kazakh SSR Cup seven times, including five consecutive triumphs between 1972 and 1976. Initially the club transferred their status to the independent Kazakhstan, and were founding members of the Kazakhstan Super League. However, barring a 7th-place finish in 1994, they were one of the weaker sides and were relegated to the Kazakhstan First Division in 1998. The club returned to the top flight in 2005, but set an unwanted record by drawing a single match and losing 29 to set a record low for points gained in the Kazakh premier league. They are currently First Division members.

On 11 December 2015, Bolat announced they would not be taking part in the 2016 Kazakhstan First Division, and would fold.

Names
1961 : Founded as Metallurg
1969 : Renamed Stroitel
1970 : Renamed Bulat
2003 : Renamed Bulat-CSKA
2005 : Renamed Bulat-MST
2007 : Renamed Bulat
2008 : Renamed Bulat-AMT
2010 : Renamed Bulat
2011 : Renamed Bulat-AMT
2016 : Renamed Shakhter-Bulat

League results

Current squad

References

External links 
 
Statistical record

Football clubs in Kazakhstan
1969 establishments in the Kazakh Soviet Socialist Republic
FC Shakhter Karagandy
Association football clubs established in 1969